Mata is a 2006 Kannada cult black comedy film written and directed by debutant director Guruprasad. It has an ensemble cast starring  Jaggesh, Vaijanath Biradar, Mandya Ramesh and others. The director himself had a cameo in the movie. Mata is a black comedy. The movie primarily revolves around the events that occur within a contemporary matha/mutts, which are revered as one of the most sacred institutions in India. The movie beautifully depicts that enlightenment is only possible if emotions like anger, lust, desire, etc. are overcome. With this movie, Guruprasad rose to fame in the industry. Mata is 100th movie for Jaggesh and 200th movie for Biradar. After the success of this film, Guruprasad and Jaggesh's combo's next movie Eddelu Manjunatha had lot of expectations which released in early 2009.

Plot
The movie starts with a taxi driver Venkatesha (Jaggesh) welcoming Sister Martha (played by Pari) to Bangalore. He needs to drive her to a matha in Thirthahalli and he starts narrating a story to make the journey interesting, interspersed with sub-stories.

The fore-said matha has an asylum taking care of handicapped orphans and a rare temple of Lord Brahma. He narrates about this matha, whose chief is a skirt-chaser and goes to the extent of playing the flute to girls over the phone just to impress upon them. Soon enough, the chief decides to part with the post in order to join his wife back.

In unique circumstances, the manager and administrator of matha, Appayya (R. N. Sudarshan) advertises in newspapers declaring vacancy for "Chief of Matha". At this point, breaking the fourth wall, R. N. Sudarshan enacting the role of Appayya declines to read out the dialogues about placing a newspaper ad about vacant Chief of Matha position. Director Guruprasad makes a cameo entry bombarding Appayya to enact his role, as he is paid to do just that viz., read out the dialogues.

The introduction scene of the film is fabulous as all the characters are invited with vedic hymns, "Asathoma Sadgamaya", which signifies the light in all directions. Tabla Nani as Venugopala nickname packet, Sudheendra as Chintamani, Shashidhar Bhat as Shashidhar bhat, Mandya Ramesh as Mandya Nagesh, Vaijanath Biradar as Kosta alias Sidda and Jaggesh as Venkatesha take the film on their shoulders. It is a great masterpiece that has every essence from crisp dialogues to a meaningful and soul-stirring script.

The characters are neglected by society, their quest for a societal status and food drives them to do all kinds of things to just remain in the training period as they want to avoid destitution. Givne that it is a multi-layered plot, the narrator (Jaggesh) infuses tit-bits of stories to the viewer and seamlessly weaves them with the main plot. For example, the comedy scenes involving Nagaraj Murthy as a desperate king, who wants to build a mausoleum for his wife, are hilarious and signifies the hold on making the audience waiting for the intuitiveness of the next scene. Sudarshan has given a great modification of a cool head who always emphasize Dharma, manager's role orchestrated by Sadananda, who is at his comical best.

The story progresses through the many travails of all the six apprentices, who fight for their place under the sun. This process takes them on a journey which transforms their previous meaningless lives into a completely different dimension. The plot also explores the many illegal activities that run behind the scenes in a mutt.

In the end, Jaggesh and the others realize the true meaning of life, and they each adopt a profession best suited to their personality. Sister Martha is revealed to be a guardian angel for the financially ailing mutt when she donates a substantial amount of money for its betterment. The movie ends with Jaggesh thanking sister Martha, and Guruprasad and Sudarshan sharing a small but lively conversation about the outcome of the story.

Cast
 Jaggesh as Upkathe Govindu a.k.a. Venkatesh, a former apprentice in matha who works as a taxi driver
 R. N. Sudarshan as Appayya, the interim chief of the matha who is training the disciples
 Nagathihalli Chandrashekar as the matha head who has left it for a woman
 Vaijanath Biradar as Siddha, an apprentice who is surprisingly calm around corpses as he was born in a cemetery
 Shashidhar Bhat as an apprentice, in the movie he represents lust
 Sudheendra as Chintamani
 Tabla Nani as Venugopal, an apprentice who is an alcoholic
 Asif Farroqi as Pasha, an apprentice, in the movie he represents anger
 Mandya Ramesh as Nagesh, an apprentice
 Guruprasad as Appayya's Son
 Sadananda as the manager of the matha who is sceptical of the trainees
 Pranavmurthy as a beggar who later undergoes a transformation facilitated by the astrologist
 Manasi as a harbinger of bad luck
 Bhagirathi bai Kadam as the blind astrologist who also practical in her thinking
 Vaishnavi Mahant 
 Pari as sister Martha
 Raju Ananthaswamy as prisoner, (cameo)
 Tara Anuradha (Cameo)
 Doddanna (Cameo)
 Sadhu Kokila (Cameo)
 Vanitha Vasu (Cameo)

Soundtrack
The film has six songs composed by V. Manohar and Udayaravi, with lyrics by K.R. Sitaram Shastri, V. Manohar, Chaturmukha and Kaviraj. They were sung by C. Ashwath, Gurukiran, B. Jayashree, Hemanth, Chetan and Chaitra.

Critical reception
It got favorable reviews from both fans and critics alike. It is said to have done reasonably well at the box office, although the exact figures of its earnings are not available. The movie came as an eye-opener to all the present-day directors that a cinema is not a bundle of songs or locations instead it is an introspecting field where a societal message should be given to the public at large.

Controversy
This movie took on a controversial color when Jaggesh was presented with a State award for best-supporting actor. Jaggesh publicly expressed his disappointment that he was chosen for the award for best supporting actor despite playing the lead role and decided to reject the state award.

References

External links
 
 

2000s Kannada-language films
2006 films
Films scored by V. Manohar
Indian black comedy films
Indian nonlinear narrative films
Films directed by Guruprasad
2006 directorial debut films